The British Electric Traction Company was a company in Mumbai that generated electricity for the city. It was established in 1882.

It had a 1,100 hp (820 kW) generator and serviced 107 consumers by 1905.

The company was bought by the Bombay Electric Supply & Tramways Company Limited the same year.

See also
British Electric Traction.

Defunct electric power companies of India
Defunct companies based in Mumbai
Energy companies established in 1882
Energy companies disestablished in 1905
1882 establishments in British India
1905 disestablishments in India
1905 mergers and acquisitions
Indian companies established in 1882